Clyde Vernon Tisdale (March 24, 1890 – January 31, 1975) was an American politician in the state of Washington. He served in the Washington House of Representatives and Washington State Senate.

References

1890 births
1975 deaths
People from Shasta County, California
People from Raymond, Washington
Democratic Party members of the Washington House of Representatives
Democratic Party Washington (state) state senators